Nymphicula michaeli is a moth in the family Crambidae. It was described by David John Lawrence Agassiz in 2014. It is found in Papua New Guinea.

The wingspan is about 11 mm. The base of the forewings and the basal half of the costa is fuscous, the antemedian fascia is whitish, edged with fuscous. The median area is scattered with fuscous scales. The basal half of the hindwings is suffused with fuscous in zigzag bands.

Etymology
The species is named for the son of the author.

References

Nymphicula
Moths described in 2014